Anathallis adrianae is a species of orchid plant native to Ecuador.

References 

adrianae
Flora of Ecuador
Plants described in 2016